Philip Oliver Ellard Hawkes was an architect who practiced in the Wide Bay area of Queensland, Australia, from 1910 to 1942. A number of his works are heritage-listed.

Early life 
Hawkes was born in 1882 in New South Wales.

Architectural career 
Hawkes worked in Perth, Launceston and Melbourne. Moving to Queensland, he worked briefly for the Works Department in 1909 before setting up his own practice in Bundaberg and Maryborough in 1910. He designed a number of premises for the Queensland National Bank; most of these were simple timber buildings, although the Kingaroy branch was a two storey masonry building, also in a Classical Revival style. This also featured round headed arches as do the Carroll Cottage and Carrollee Hotel in Kingaroy, which were also designed by Hawkes.

Notable works 
 Queensland National Bank, Childers
 Goomeri Hall of Memory 
 St Pauls Anglican Church and Hall, Maryborough 
 Maryborough War Memorial 
 Pialba Memorial Cenotaph 
 Lady Musgrave Maternity Hospital and nurses' quarters at Maryborough Base Hospital
 St Mary's Roman Catholic Church, Maryborough

References

Further reading 
 
 

1882 births
20th-century Australian architects
Architects from Queensland
Maryborough, Queensland
Year of death missing